Wellington Road may refer to:

Wellington Road, Cork
Wellington Road (London, Ontario)
Wellington Road (Manassas, Virginia)
Wellington Road (Perry Barr), a former football ground and home of Aston Villa
 Wellington Road, a stretch of the A4040 road in Perry Barr, where the football ground is located
Wellington Road, South Australia
Wellington Road, Victoria, Australia
Wellington Road, Singapore, a road in Sembawang
Wellington Road, St John's Wood, a road in London, England